Tihomil Vranješ  (born 10 November 1977) is a Croatian male water polo player. He was a member of the Croatia men's national water polo team, playing as a driver. He was a part of the  team at the 2004 Summer Olympics. On club level he played most notably for VK Jug Dubrovnik in Croatia and Olympiacos in Greece.

See also
 Croatia men's Olympic water polo team records and statistics

References

External links
 

1977 births
Living people
Croatian male water polo players
Olympiacos Water Polo Club players
Water polo players at the 2004 Summer Olympics
Olympic water polo players of Croatia
People from Dubrovnik